Mohamed Bahlouli (born 17 February 2000) is a French professional footballer who plays as a midfielder.

Career
Bahlouli joined Serie B club Cosenza Calcio on loan from Sampdoria for the 2020–21 season having already spent the second half of the previous season there.

On 30 July 2021, he left Sampdoria by mutual consent.

In January 2022 he signed with Lithuanian club Kauno Žalgiris.

Personal life
Born in France, Bahlouli is of Algerian descent. His brother, Farès Bahlouli, is also a professional footballer.

References

Living people
2000 births
Association football midfielders
French footballers
French sportspeople of Algerian descent
Championnat National 2 players
Serie B players
Olympique Lyonnais players
U.C. Sampdoria players
Cosenza Calcio players
FK Kauno Žalgiris players
French expatriate footballers
French expatriate sportspeople in Italy
Expatriate footballers in Italy
French expatriate sportspeople in Lithuania
Expatriate footballers in Lithuania